A.C. Doukas Basketball, commonly known as Doukas B.C. or Doukas, (Greek: Αθλητικός Σύλλογος Εκπαιδευτηρίων Δούκα/Α.Σ.Ε.Δ.) is a Greek professional basketball club that is based in Marousi, Athens, Greece. It was founded in 1979, by Doukas School, and its team colours are blue and white. The home arena of the club is the Dais Gymnasium in Marousi. Currently, the men's team plays in Greek A2 League, the Greek second division.

History
Doukas' basketball team was founded in the early 1990s. In the 2013–14 season, the club finished in 10th place in the Greek B League, and remained in the third division. The most successful era of the club's history was the period 2003–2007, when the club played in the A2 Category (second division). In the 2004–05 season, Doukas in finished in 9th place, which was the highest place the club had attained to that point in its presence in the A2 category.

In the 2006–07 season, the club was relegated down to the Greek B League, and from the 2007–08 season, to the 2014–15 season, the club played continuously in the B League. In the 2014–15 season, Doukas finished in 12th place in the B League. But Doukas then merged with the A2 League club Aetos, and was subsequently promoted to the A2.

Recent seasons

Roster

Notable players

  Giannis Giannoulis
  Georgios Kalaitzis
  Vassilis Symtsak
  Apollon Tsochlas
  Sotiris Manolopoulos
  Panagiotis Kafkis
  Dimitrios Kompodietas
  Alexis Kyritsis
  Tasos Spyropoulos
  Georgios Limniatis
  Theodoros Karras
  Manolis Papamakarios
  Andreas Kanonidis
  Nikos Rogkavopoulos
  Iakovos Milentigievits
 / Nikos Pavlos
  Stefan Đorđević
  Guillem Rubio

References

External links
Official Site 
Eurobasket.com Team Page

1979 establishments in Greece
Basketball teams established in 1979
Basketball teams in Greece
Marousi